New Domohani railway station (Station code:NQH) is a railway junction station which serves Domohani, and lies along the bank of River Teesta, the other station is Domohani railway station (station code DOI) which lies in New Mal–Changrabandha–New Cooch Behar line in Jalpaiguri district in the Indian state of West Bengal. New Domohani station lies in New Jalpaiguri–New Bongaigaon section of  Barauni–Guwahati line of Northeast Frontier Railway in Alipurduar railway division.

History
The old Domohani railway station which is situated around 2 km northwest of the new station was the Jalpaiguri headquarters of the erstwhile Bengal Dooars Railway, which was functional from 1891 to 1941. This important station was the centre for the railway timber industry which was fed by the forests of Lataguri. Wooden railway sleepers laid all over the subcontinent was shipped from north Bengal originating from this railway head. Freight and passenger services connected this station with other regions in Bengal Duars and the rest of eastern Bengal, with the headquarters at Lalmonirhat, now in Bangladesh thus giving it access to the Calcutta main route. Located on the eastern bank of the Teesta, timber was loaded and assembled here from throughout Bengal Dooars and ferried across the Teesta to Jalpaiguri near present-day Paharpur More and from Jalpaiguri it was transported to the Calcutta mainline. Now dried of its economic potential in the Indian nation state, this once bustling railway station is now defunct.

Construction of the -long  broad gauge Siliguri–Jogihopa line, between 1963 and 1965, created broad-gauge railway links in North Bengal and Assam.

Accident

References

Alipurduar railway division
Railway stations in Jalpaiguri district
Transport in Jalpaiguri
Year of establishment missing